The Women's EHF Champions League is the competition for the top women's handball clubs in Europe, organised annually by the European Handball Federation (EHF). It is the most prestigious tournament for clubs, with the champions of Europe's top national leagues participating.

Tournament structure
Each year, the EHF publishes a ranking list of its member federations. The first 27 nations are allowed to participate in the tournament with their national champion. The national federations are allowed to request extra places or upgrades from the EHF Cup.

The EHF Champions League is divided into five stages. Depending on the ranking of their national federation and of the criteria list, teams can enter the competition in either qualification or the group phase.

The current playing system changed for the 2020–21 season.

Qualification tournament 
Groups of four teams are formed. The number of groups can vary each season. Teams from each group play semi-finals and finals, in a single venue over a weekend. The winning team from each group advance to the group phase, while teams from lower ranks continue in the EHF Cup.

Tournament format 
Each year, the EHF publishes a ranking list of its member federations. The first nine nations are allowed to participate in the tournament with their national champion. In addition, the tenth spot is reserved for the best ranked national federation of the EHF European League. The national federations are allowed to request upgrades for their teams eligible to play in the EHF European League and based on the criteria list the EHF Executive Committee approves six upgrades.

The EHF Champions League is divided into four stages. All participating teams enter the competition in the group phase.

The current playing system has been introduced before the 2020–21 season.

Group phase 
Since the 2020–21 season, the format sees two groups formed, with eight teams each in Group A and B. All the teams in each group play each other twice, in home and away matches (14 rounds in total). The first two teams in Groups A and B advance directly to the quarter-finals, while teams from positions three to six in each of these groups proceed to the play off. The season is over for the last two teams in each group after the completion of the group phase.

Play off 
The pairings for the play off are decided by the placement of the teams at the end of the group phase (A6 vs B3, B6 vs A3, A5 vs B4 and B5 vs A4). Each pairing is decided via a home and away format, with the aggregate winners over the two legs advancing to the quarter-finals. The higher ranked teams in the group phase have the home right advantage in the second leg.

Quarter-finals

The pairings for the quarter-finals are also decided by the placement in the group phase (Winner of A5/B4 vs A1, Winner B5/A4 vs B1, Winner A6/B3 vs A2, Winner B6/A3 vs B2). The ties are decided through a home and away format, with the four winners over the two legs played in each pairing advancing to the EHF FINAL4. The higher ranked teams in the group phase have the home right advantage in the second leg.

EHF FINAL4

The participating EHF FINAL4 teams are paired for the semi-finals through a draw and play the last two matches of the season over a single weekend at one venue. The two semi-finals are played on a Saturday, with the third-place game and final on a Sunday.

Summary

European Champions Cup

EHF Women's Champions League (knockout system)

EHF Women's Champions League (EHF FINAL4 system)

Records and statistics

Performance by club

Performance by country

All-time top scorers
Last updated after the 2021–22 season

Bold: players in bold are active in the current season.

All-time top scorers of the WOMEN'S EHF FINAL4
Last updated after the 2021–22 season

Bold: players in bold are active in the current season.

Top scorers by season

WOMEN'S EHF FINAL4 MVPs by season

Goals scored in the Final Four by nations
All goals (1725) scored in the Final Four by the nationality of the players. 
Last updated after the 2021/22 season.

Top Scorers by Team

Top Scorers by Country
(Nationality of the Top Scorer Players)

Players with the most Champions League titles

See also
EHF Champions League
Women's EHF European League

References

General references

External links

 
European Handball Federation competitions
Women's handball competitions
Recurring sporting events established in 1961
Multi-national professional sports leagues